India national volleyball team may refer to:

 India men's national volleyball team
 India women's national volleyball team